Henri Dubuis (November 4, 1906 in Bellinzona Ravecchia Canton Ticino, Switzerland – January 13, 2003 in Biel/Bienne), was a Swiss architect. He completed an apprenticeship as a mason before he studied architecture. Henri Dubuis is the grandfather of the American (born Swiss) architect, façade engineer, and conceptual artist JP. Kocher.

Career 
After graduation from the Ecole Technique Superieure in Lausanne, he worked at Le Corbusier's office in Paris, France for six years. First as an architecture apprentice and later as a collaborateur. Upon his return to Switzerland in 1931, collaborating with the architect Eduard Lanz, he designed and built the Volkshaus in Biel/Bienne in 1932.

Following the successful completion of the Volkshaus, and in collaboration with his wife Marguerite Dubuis (née Allemand) he established his own architecture practice in 1936, initially located in Biel/Bienne and then in Evilard, Canton of Berne.

1906 births
2003 deaths
Architects from Ticino
Swiss architects
People from Biel/Bienne
People from Bellinzona